The Iron Gate (in Orkhon and Tonyukuk inscriptions;   Darband), is a defile between Balkh and Samarkand. It breaks up the mountains which extend from the Hisar range south towards the Amu Darya. In ancient times it was used as the passage between Bactria and Sogdia and was likely of great importance to any power in the region. Its name comes from the belief that an actual gate, reinforced with Iron, stood in the defile. It is located to west from Boysun, Surxondaryo Region. Although its exact location is debatable, it is usually considered to be the  pass on the road from Samarkand (Uzbekistan) to Balkh (Afghanistan) and close to Qarshi city. According to historian Lev Gumilev its present name is "Buzgala".

In the Orkhon Inscriptions
Medieval Turks controlled the Silk Road during the Göktürk Empire. It was an important source of revenue. Temir Kapig was a strategically important point to control the Silk Road.

Orkhon inscriptions (also known as Khöshöö Tsaidam monuments) which were erected in 730s, are about Bilge Khagan, a Turkic emperor and his brother Kul Tigin. Bain Tsokto inscriptions which were erected shortly before the Khöshöö Tsaidam monuments are about Tonyukuk, the counselor of Bilge. In all of these inscriptions, the geographical name Temir Kapig had been mentioned several times. Below are some examples.

In Kültigin's inscription (South side)
In west, I sent an army over the Pearl River to the Iron Gate

In Bilge Khagan's inscription (East side)
(Referring to Bumin Khagan) He annexed all territory from Kadıgan forest in the east to the Iron Gate in the west.

In Tonyukuk's inscription (2nd monument, South side)
(Referring to campaign in 701) We reached the Iron Gate

Notes

References

Sources

 
 
 

Geography of Central Asia
Mountain passes of Asia
Landforms of Uzbekistan
Geography of Uzbekistan